The 2012–2013 Israeli Basketball Super League, for sponsorship reasons known as Ligat Loto, was the 59th season of the Israeli Basketball Super League. The season began on 14 October 2012, and ended on 13 June 2013.

Maccabi Haifa won its first-ever Israeli championship.

Teams

Team changes 

No team has Relegated as there was no relegation spot in last season.
Hapoel Tel Aviv been promoted to the league after winning Ligat Leumit last season. Another new team is Hapoel Eilat as the owner of Habik'a B.C. moved his license to the city of Eilat.

Stadia and locations

Head coaches

Regular season 

Pld – Played; W – Won; L – Lost; PF – Points for; PA – Points against; Diff – Difference; Pts – Points.

Quarterfinals

The Quarterfinals were played as The-Best-Of-5 series. The higher ranked team hosted games 1, 3 and 5 (if necessary). The lower ranked team hosted games 2 and 4 (if necessary).

Semifinals

The Semifinals were played as The-Best-Of-5 series. The higher ranked team hosted games 1, 3 and 5 (if necessary). The lower ranked team hosted games 2 and 4 (if necessary).

Final

The Final was held on 13 June at Romema Arena.

Individual statistics

Rating

Points

Rebounds

Assists

All-Star Game
The 2013 Israeli League All-star event was held on March 18, 2013, at the Romema Arena, Haifa.

Three-point shootout

Slam Dunk Contest

Awards

Regular season MVP

 Gal Mekel (Maccabi Haifa)

All-BSL 1st team
 Gal Mekel (Maccabi Haifa)
 Scotty Hopson (Hapoel Eilat)
 Devin Smith (Maccabi Tel Aviv)
 Pat Calathes (Maccabi Haifa)
 Shawn James (Maccabi Tel Aviv)

Coach of the season
 Brad Greenberg (Maccabi Haifa)

Rising star
 Bar Timor (Hapoel Tel Aviv)

Best Defender
 Shawn James (Maccabi Tel Aviv)

Most Improved Player
 Eyal Shulman (Barak Netanya)

Sixth Man of the Season
 Yehu Orland (Barak Netanya)

References

External links
IBA's official website (Hebrew)

Israeli Basketball Premier League seasons
Israeli
Basketball